The ARIA Albums Chart ranks the best-performing albums and extended plays (EPs) in Australia. Its data, published by the Australian Recording Industry Association, is based collectively on the weekly physical and digital sales of albums and EPs. In 2021, 34 albums claimed the top spot; Taylor Swift achieved three number-ones during the year, while her album Evermore spent the first two weeks of the year at number one after spending two weeks atop the chart in December 2020. 14 acts, Barry Gibb, Joff Bush (the composer of the Australian animated series Bluey), the Kid Laroi, the Rubens, Tash Sultana, Architects, Skegss, London Grammar, Olivia Rodrigo, Tones and I, the Jungle Giants, Luke Hemmings, Lil Nas X and Ruby Fields, achieved their first number-one album.

Rodrigo spent the most weeks at number one in 2021 with her album Sour spending eight non-consecutive weeks at the top, while Swift had the most, achieving three number-one albums during the year (Evermore, Fearless (Taylor's Version) and Red (Taylor's Version)).

Chart history

Number-one artists

See also
2021 in music
ARIA Charts
List of number-one singles of 2021 (Australia)

References

2021
Australia albums
Number-one albums